La Viga is a station along Line 8 of the metro of Mexico City.

The station's logo is a pair of fishes since the neighborhood it serves (Colonia Jamaica) is home to Mercado de La Viga – one of the larger seafood markets in Mexico City.

From 23 April to 18 June 2020, the station was temporarily closed due to the COVID-19 pandemic in Mexico.

Ridership

References

External links 
 

Mexico City Metro Line 8 stations
Railway stations opened in 1994
1994 establishments in Mexico
Mexico City Metro stations in Cuauhtémoc, Mexico City
Mexico City Metro stations in Venustiano Carranza, Mexico City